The Altai steppe and semi-desert ecoregion (WWF ID: PA0802), as its name indicates, sits in a transition zine between steppe and semi-desert, supporting sparse grass and shrublands.  The area is relatively undeveloped, with agriculture mostly represented by grazing livestock.  There are a few shallow lakes in depressions used by migratory birds.

Location and description 
The ecoregion is situated between steppe on its south (the Emin Valley steppe ecoregion) and conifer forests to its north (the Altai montane forest and forest steppe ecoregion).  To the west is the Kazakh semi-desert ecoregion and to the east is the Junggar Basin semi-desert and Lake Zaysan.  The Irtysh River runs along the northeast of the ecoregion, and the Tarbagatay Mountains along the south.  A small portion of the ecoregion reaches into China.

Climate 
The climate of the ecoregion is Humid continental climate, warm summer (Köppen climate classification (Dfb)).

Flora and fauna 
The ground cover is grassland, shrubs, and bare rock.  Use of the land for livestock range is putting pressure on wildlife.  The Manrak ridge in the southeast of the region is an important area for birds, with 121 species identified.

See also 
 List of ecoregions in China

References 

Ecoregions of China
Ecoregions of Kazakhstan
Palearctic ecoregions
Temperate grasslands, savannas, and shrublands